Hong Kong participated in the 1958 Asian Games held in Tokyo, Japan from May 24 to June 1, 1958.
The country ranked 13th with a silver and bronze medal.

Medalists

Medal summary

Medal table

References

Nations at the 1958 Asian Games
1958